Danijel Gašić (born 19 January 1987) is a retired Serbian footballer, who played as a defender.

Club career
Gašić has started his career with Župa, and later, he moved to Kruševac, in Trayal. Gašić joined to Napredak in season 2007–08, but for that season, he played only 4 league matches. He did not start the 2008-09 season as a first choice, but later, he played constantly, and made 19 appearances. In the 2009–10 season, he was already in starting 11. He missed some matches, but he had 21 appearances and scored 2 goals, but not enough to stay in Serbian SuperLiga with Napredak. Also, he got a red card on last fixture, after 28 minutes, in loss of his team versus Vojvodina on the Karađorđe Stadium with result 7:0. He also stayed with Napredak in the 2010-11 season, and played in Serbian First League. Team has not the great results, but Gašić was one of better players. He played 22 matches and scored 3 goals. After he was scouted around a year long time, he arrived at OFK as a perspective player on a stopper place. In first season playing for OFK Beograd, he played 17 times in league, and 1 in cup matches. The first half of the 2012-13 season was not great, because team has bad results, he scored one own goal, and later, he has been injured. Second half of season was much better. Team had better results when he was playing. Gašić made 9 league, and 2 cup appearances for Kalloni., scoring 1 goal. He joined to Sloga Kraljevo for second half of season 2013–14. After doubtful match versus Dolina Padina, and first home-lost in season, with result 1:2, direction of Sloga Kraljevo fired him and Bojan Šejić. As a member of FK Jagodina, Gašić played between 2014 and 2016, when he moved to Dinamo Vranje.

At the end of the 2018/19 season, Gašić decided to retire.

Career statistics

Club

References

External links
 Danijel Gašić stats at utakmica.rs
 
 

1987 births
Living people
People from Aleksandrovac
Serbian footballers
Serbian First League players
Serbian SuperLiga players
FK Napredak Kruševac players
OFK Beograd players
FK Sloga Kraljevo players
FK Jagodina players
FK Dinamo Vranje players
Association football defenders
Serbian expatriate footballers
Serbian expatriate sportspeople in Greece
Expatriate footballers in Greece
Super League Greece players